Frank Bailey (birth and death unknown) was an English footballer who played as an outside left with Doncaster Rovers in the Football League at the beginning of the 1900s.

Playing career

Doncaster Rovers
Coming from Sheffield club, Darnall Rovers, Bailey played in the opening game in Doncaster's debut season in the Football League in 1901, scoring the third and equalising goal against Burslem Port Vale.

He made 23 Football League and FA Cup appearances for Rovers, scoring 6 goals. He left after just one season, moving to Worksop Town in the Midland League.

References

19th-century births
Year of death missing
Footballers from Sheffield
English footballers
Association football wingers
Doncaster Rovers F.C. players
Worksop Town F.C. players
English Football League players
Midland Football League players
Place of death missing